Marostica, is a town and comune in the province of Vicenza, Veneto, northern Italy. It is mostly famous for its live chess event and for the local cherry variety.

History

Between the 11th and 13th centuries, the locality was greatly influenced by several members of the important medieval family from the Veneto, known as the Ezzelini. They were finally defeated in 1260. Marostica was a Venetian city until Venice joined Italy. During the 19th century it was mainly a relatively poor town; a great number of inhabitants went to look for fortune in Brazil and many other places in the world. The wealth of the town grew greatly after the second world war.

Marostica is famous for the human chess game it carries out every 2 years (in the even-numbered years), with living chess pieces, in the city public square.

Festival Facts
According to legend the original match took place on September 12, 1454, so during the 2nd weekend in September of even-numbered years, this reenacted game of chess using live pieces is played; but this has not always been the case.

After the First World War, members of the local chess club began playing chess in the main square with 10 cm gilded pieces which caught the attention of then mayor Bonomo and the architect Mirko Vucetich. They became inspired and set about reviving the biennial reenactment of the life-sized human chess match that had been interrupted due to the wartime events. After the Second World War, some 20 years later, the artist  who authored the work entitled “The Chess Game,” in which the original legend is memorialized, designed the new elements of the festival.

The renovated chess board measured 16 meters per side, framed by a large band of black tarchite, which contains the 64 square squares obtained from 4 slabs of pink Conco marble and Asiago biancone. In addition to the newly renovated chessboard, the medieval costumes and sets of the era were also redesigned.

Unfortunately, the original game was played so long ago that the original moves by the knights have been lost to time so ‘a group’ of designated chess players choose one of the more famous chess matches in recent history to use at the formal presentation.

During the presentation once one of the two knights/suitors have made a move, a crier calls out the movement for the living chess piece; these orders are still given out in the "Serenissima Republic of Venice" dialect.

The Legend
The two noblemen, Rinaldo D'Angarano and Vieri da Vallanora, fell in love with Lionora, the daughter of the local lord, Taddeo Parisio. As was the custom at that time, they challenged each other to a duel to win her hand. The Lord of Marostica, not wanting to make an enemy of either suitor nor lose them in a duel, forbade the encounter. *He decreed instead that the two rivals would play a chess game and the winner would have the hand of Lionora. The loser of the chess game would also join the family, by marrying her younger sister, Oldrada. The chess match took place on September 12 in the year 1454.

The reenactment of the legendary chess match takes place on the square in front of the Lower Castle with supporters carrying the noble ensigns of Whites and Blacks, in the presence of the Lord, his noble daughter, the Lords of Angarano and Leoncavallo, the court and the entire town population. The Lord also decides the challenge would be honoured by an exhibition of armed men, foot-soldiers and knights, with fireworks and dances and music, which makes the approximately 20 minute chess game the anchor of a festival of epic proportions.

Marostica is also home to the Diesel Farm, a wine, grappa, and olive oil-producing establishment, founded by Diesel founder Renzo Rosso. Nonetheless, Marostica is also very famous for the production of cherries, used in the preparation of a typical cake, served in all cafes and restaurants in the area.

International relations

Twin towns – Sister cities
Marostica is twinned with:
 São Bernardo do Campo, Brazil
 Tendō, Japan
 Mignano Monte Lungo, Italy
 Montigny-le-Bretonneux, France

Notable people

 Prospero Alpini, physician and botanist, born 1553
 Giovanni Battaglin, cyclist, Giro d'Italia and Vuelta a España winner
 Giancarlo Bonato (1930-2016) craftsman, artist and entrepreneur
 Tatiana Guderzo, cyclist, Italian and World Champion
 Enrico Battaglin, cyclist

Gallery

References

External links
| Official touristic website

Cities and towns in Veneto